Chunapur is a very old village situated 3 km west of Purnia town in the state of Bihar, India. This village is situated on the bank of 'Kari Koshi' a tributary of River Koshi. 
The village came into limelight when the government of India constructed a huge aerodrome for strategic purposes known as Chunapur Aerodrome.
The village is famous due to the Roy family which has produced renowned personalities. The Roy family had huge landholdings in an around Purnea district of Bihar which they used for settlement of landless laborers and general welfare of people. Late Shri Vanshmani Roy and Late Shri Vankhandi Roy were two scions of the family whose descendants are now spread across country and outside country. One of the most famoust personality was Late Shri Deo Nath Roy who was veteran freedom fighter and former MLA of Purnea. He had surrendered his hundred of acres of agricultural landholdings in favor of share croppers in Ararria district of Bihar.

It also has an airbase for Indian Air Force.

Establishment of Middle School 
For the development of their village, Late Shri shardanand roy, Dr. Mohan Roy along with Mr. Kumar Roy took the initiative to establish reputed education system in Chunapur. This effort was initially made by their grandfather Shri. Bankhandi Roy, who constructed a Sanskrit school in the year 1935. The school could not operate after the death of Shri. Bankhandi Roy in the year 1942.

Dr. Mohan Roy along with Mr. Kumar Roy took steps to set up free education for their village. They started the work to build a school in the name of their parents Smt. Shashimukhi Roy and Shri. Ramnarayan Roy. About 3 acres of land were required for building the school. Mr. Kumar Roy persuaded a number of landowners in the village to donate land. These included Shri. Ramnarayan Roy, Shri. Sunderkand Jha, Shri. Sambhunath Roy and Shri.Tirpit Roy. Mr. Kumar Roy’s business (Four Star Picture Palace) also funded the construction of the school building. In 1988, the construction of "Shashimukhi Ramnarayan Aadarsh Madhya Vidyalaya" (Middle school) was finished and donated to the government of Bihar.This school creates many bright students of the chunapur who are currently serves all over the country for the betterment of the humanity.

DAV Public School 
Further to establish a quality education system in Chunapur, Dr. Mohan Roy and Mr. Kumar Roy reached out to the Dayanand Anglo-Vedic School System to open their branch in Chunapur. Shri Ramnarayan Roy, father of Dr. Roy and Mr. Roy, donated his land for the proposed school. D.A.V system opened their branch in Chunapur in the year 1998. The school was called S. R D.A.V Public School (Shahsimukhi Ramnarayan DAV public school) in honor of the couple Mrs. Shashimukhi Roy and Mr. Ramnarayan Roy.

This school served the entire Purnea area. However, Chunapur was not very well connected to the city of Purnea, which was an inconvenience for the school students. For this reason, the school decided to move to the Purnea Municipal Area. Dr. Mohan Roy donated land in Purnea for this move. In the year 1999, S.R.D.A.V Public School moved from Chunapur to Purnea.

References

Villages in Purnia district